Lorenzo Nencini (January 10, 1806 – March 14, 1854) was an Italian sculptor, active in Florence.

Nencini was born in Florence, and in 1819 admitted to that city's Academy of Fine Arts. Starting in 1823, he served his apprenticeship under sculptor Stefano Ricci (1765-1837), from whom Nencini adopted Canova's classicism. In 1827, he won a prize from the Academy, and two years later he was given another prize for his bas-relief depicting Adam and Eve expelled from Eden. In 1832, he executed a statue of Saint Nicholas, now lost, noted for its reproduction of the historical clothes and accessories. In 1837, he showed a plaster model of what was deemed "the most beautiful of his works" (Saltini, 1862, p. 35), a lounging Bacchante in the act of eating grapes; he exhibited it again at Brera in 1838 and donated it to the Academy in Milan, where it remains today. In 1837, he created the effigy of Guido of Arezzo, inventor of the musical score, for the twenty-seventh niche of the outdoor Loggiato of the Uffizi; it was inaugurated ten years later on 24 June 1847.

In 1838, Nencini created the tomb of Giovita Garavaglia for the Florentine basilica of Santissima Annunziata. He was then commissioned to decorate the porch of the church of Follonica with two bas-reliefs, as well as the gate of San Marco di Livorno, and following these prestigious commissions was commissioned in 1840-41 to execute the bust of Evangelista Torricelli and a medallion depicting Alessandro Marsili (1601-1670) for the Observatory of Galileo in Florence. In 1844, he became member of the Academy of Arts, but only in 1849 managed to be appointed to that institution as deputy sculpture teacher. On September 11, 1853, he was elected member of the Academic Council for the section of the sculptors. His work was exhibited at the London Universal Exposition of 1854. He died in Florence that year.

References 
 Dizionario Biografico degli Italiani - (2013)
 RKD (Netherlands Institute for Art History)
 Rapporto generale della Pubblica Esposizione dei prodotti naturali e industriali della Toscana, fatta in Firenze, Florence, Italy, 1854, Allegato XXVII.  
 Historical memory of William Henry Saltini, Florence, 1862, page 35.

1806 births
1854 deaths
19th-century Italian sculptors
Italian male sculptors
Accademia di Belle Arti di Firenze alumni
Academic staff of the Accademia di Belle Arti di Firenze
19th-century Italian male artists